Katanning is a town located  south-east of Perth, Western Australia on the Great Southern Highway. At the 2016 census, Katanning had a population of 3,687.

History
The name Katanning is derived from the native name for a camping place. That native name for the camp was 'Kartannup' - 'Kart' meaning head and 'annup' meaning meeting or camping place. In the very early days before town settlement, a big tribe of natives lived in the area. When the tribe of another district would visit annually, Kartannup was the head camp or meeting place. In the 21st century, in one of the many possible examples of the attempted re-writing of history, some have tried to suggest that Kartanup, means "clear pool of sweet water", or that Katanning, means "spiders on your back". Others suggest that the place is named after a local Aboriginal woman.

The first Europeans to explore the Katanning area were Governor James Stirling and Surveyor General John Septimus Roe who travelled through the area in 1835 en route from Perth to Albany.

In about 1870, sandalwood cutters moved into the area but they did not settle. It was not until the development of the Great Southern Railway, a land grant railway built by the West Australian Land Company from Beverley to Albany in 1889, that the township came into existence.

The townsite was initially developed by the West Australian Land Company. The state government purchased the railway and the townsite in 1896 and later formally gazetted the town in 1898, when the population of the town was 226, 107 males and 119 females.

In April 1891 the Premier Roller Flour Mill was opened in the centre of the town by brothers Frederick Henry Piesse and Charles Austin Piesse. The mill provided an important cash market for local wheat growers. Initially the mill supplied flour to the whole of the Albany district, replacing more expensive imports from Adelaide. At that time Albany was Western Australia's principal port. The ground-floor street frontages of the mill were converted into shops from the 1930s, including a music shop, butchers', dress shops, a barber, and tearooms. By 2008 the building was owned by the Shire of Katanning, which sold it for $1 to a private developer who renovated the by-then dilapidated building and turned it into a hotel and restaurant that opened in 2018.

Katanning remains an important centre on the Great Southern Railway to Albany.

Climate
Katanning sits on the border between the warm-summer and the purely subtropical mediterranean varieties with January and February being just below . Under the Köppen climate classification it is classified as Csb.

Features

A statue of Frederick Henry Piesse (by sculptor Pietro Porcelli) was erected in 1916 and stands beside the railway line in Austral Terrace. The Piesse family constructed a regal mansion which was named "Kobeelya" and after being used for many years as a girls' boarding school, is now a conference centre managed by the local Baptist church.

Katanning features a unique playground of oversized structures named the "All Ages Playground".  The town has many other attractions, including a state of the art recreation, leisure and function centre.

Katanning has a relatively large Muslim population, of about 350 people, and consequently has a mosque, the Katanning Mosque. The vast majority of local Muslims originated in the Cocos (Keeling) Islands, and travelled to Katanning to work in the local abattoir, which was established in the late 1970s.

Other religious buildings include churches from Anglican, Baptist, Catholic, Lutheran, Seventh Day Adventist, Uniting, and Wesleyan denominations, along with a Jehovah's Witness Kingdom Hall.

The town has a castle-like structure which was built as a winery. The town's entrance features an antique truck loaded with imitation wool bales, a windmill, and several sculptures of sheep made from corrugated iron.

The town has become a regional service centre for the Great Southern and services the nearby towns of Broomehill, Tambellup and Woodanilling plus several more. It contains three primary schools, Katanning Primary School, Braeside Primary School, and St Patrick's School, and a high school, Katanning Senior High School.

Transport 

Notable residents
 Kevin O'Halloran, gold medallist in the 4 × 200 m freestyle relay at the 1956 Summer Olympics in Melbourne was born and raised in nearby Kojonup, and the pool is named after him.
 Percy Gratwick, posthumous Victoria Cross recipient in World War II was born in Katanning.
 Angela Ryder, a Wilman Noongar woman
 Mark Williams, Essendon footballer.
 Lydia Williams, Football Goalkeeper for the Australia women's national soccer team
 Alan Quartermaine, WAFL Footballer for East Perth, Sandover Medallist 1972.

References

External links

 Katanning WA

 
Towns in Western Australia
Great Southern (Western Australia)
Grain receival points of Western Australia